Santa Bernardina is a suburb of Durazno, the capital city of Durazno Department, in central Uruguay.

Geography
This suburb is located to the north of the city of Durazno, across the river Río Yí. Directly east of the suburb is the Santa Bernardina International Airport.

Population
In 2011, Santa Bernardina had a population of 1,094.
 
Source: Instituto Nacional de Estadística de Uruguay

References

External links
INE map of Durazno and Santa Bernardina

Populated places in the Durazno Department